Robert Ryan Odom (born July 11, 1974) is an American men's college basketball coach who is currently the head coach of the Utah State Aggies men's basketball team. He was previously the head coach of the Lenoir–Rhyne Bears and the UMBC Retrievers. 

Odom served as the interim head coach of the Charlotte 49ers men's basketball team from January 6 until March 15, 2015.  In this capacity, he replaced Alan Major when Major went on a medical leave of absence to deal with chronic health issues.

After one season as head coach at Lenoir–Rhyne, Odom was head coach at UMBC from 2016 to 2021. In the 2018 NCAA Division I Men's Basketball Tournament, UMBC upset no. 1 seed Virginia and became the first no. 16 seed to beat a no. 1 seed in tournament history. In 2021, Odom became head coach at Utah State.

Playing career
Odom graduated from Richard J. Reynolds High School in Winston-Salem, North Carolina, in 1992 and enrolled at Hampden–Sydney College out of high school. Odom was a four-year starting point guard for the Hampden–Sydney Tigers under head coach Tony Shaver, serving as team captain his senior year. He left the Tigers ranking the school's all-time leader in three-point field goals, and fourth in assists. Odom graduated from Hampden–Sydney in 1996 with a degree in economics.

Coaching career
Odom began his coaching career as a graduate assistant at South Florida. He also had stops as an assistant coach with Furman, UNC Asheville, and American, before spending seven years on Seth Greenberg's staff at Virginia Tech. In 2010, he joined the coaching staff of Charlotte, serving as an assistant for five years, including being interim head coach.

Odom was relieved of his coaching duties on March 16, 2015 when Major and the university mutually agreed to part ways, and his staff was not retained.  Odom compiled an overall record of 8–11 as Charlotte's interim coach.

After Charlotte, Odom accepted the job at Lenoir-Rhyne, leading the Bears to the Quarterfinals of the NCAA Division II tournament in his only season at the helm, before accepting the head coaching position at Division I UMBC, replacing Aki Thomas.

UMBC
In his first season at the helm of the Retrievers, Odom orchestrated a 14-win improvement over the team's 7–25 season the previous year to a 21–13 overall record, and fifth-place finish in the America East Conference. The 21 wins are second-most in school history. For its efforts, UMBC accepted a bid to the 2017 CollegeInsider.com Postseason Tournament, where it won its first round matchup against Fairfield for the first postseason win in program history. From there the Retrievers defeated St. Francis (PA) in the second round and advanced past Liberty in the CIT quarterfinals before falling to Texas A&M–Corpus Christi in the semifinals.

The 2017–18 regular season saw the Retrievers finish in second place in the America East, with a 12–4 record, and earning the conference's automatic berth into the NCAA Tournament when it knocked off Vermont 65–62 in the 2018 America East men's basketball tournament final, earning its second-ever NCAA Tournament appearance. During the 2018 NCAA tournament, the Retrievers became the first #16 men's seed ever to defeat a #1 seed in the first round with a 74–54 victory over Virginia. After the historic win, the Retrievers lost in the second round to Kansas State, 50–43. The following season, Odom led the Retrievers to another 20-win season and another appearance in the 2019 America East tournament final, where it fell to Vermont. In his final year at UMBC, Odom guided the Retrievers to a share of the America East regular season crown for the first time since 2008.

Utah State
On April 5, 2021, Odom was announced as the head coach at Utah State.

Personal life 
Odom was born in Durham, North Carolina. He is the son of former East Carolina, Wake Forest, and South Carolina head coach Dave Odom. Ryan Odom is married and has two children.

His son Connor, who currently plays for him at Utah State, was one of two recipients of the United States Basketball Writers Association's Perry Wallace Most Courageous Award in 2023. Connor received the award for his advocacy on mental health issues after going public with his own struggles with anxiety and obsessive–compulsive disorder following a teenage bout with Lyme disease. He shared the award with Saint Louis' Terrence Hargrove, another player who openly discussed his own mental health issues.

Head coaching record

*Charlotte head coach Alan Major took an indefinite leave of absence due to medical reasons on January 6, 2015. Charlotte's record at the time was 6–7 (0–1 C-USA).

Footnotes

References

1974 births
Living people
American Eagles men's basketball coaches
American men's basketball players
Basketball coaches from North Carolina
Basketball players from North Carolina
Charlotte 49ers men's basketball coaches
College men's basketball head coaches in the United States
Furman Paladins men's basketball coaches
Hampden–Sydney Tigers basketball players
Lenoir–Rhyne Bears men's basketball coaches
Point guards
UMBC Retrievers men's basketball coaches
UNC Asheville Bulldogs men's basketball coaches
Utah State Aggies men's basketball coaches
Virginia Tech Hokies men's basketball coaches
Sportspeople from Winston-Salem, North Carolina
Sportspeople from Durham, North Carolina